Khorlo (Tib.: འཁོར་ལོ་; 'khor-lo) means: 'wheel', 'round', 'mandala', 'chakra', 'samsara'.

It appears in the names of some tantric deities such as Chakrasamvara ('khor-lo bde-mchog, "wheel of great bliss") and Kalachakra (dus-kyi 'khor-lo, "wheel of time").

With a different connotation, it can also refer to samsara, or worldly, mundane life, full of suffering (as in "to flow together").

See also
Bhavachakra
Gankyil
Sudarshana Chakra

References 

Tibetan Buddhism